Griffith University Busway Station located in Brisbane, Australia serving the Griffith University, Mount Gravatt and Nathan campuses. It opened on 30 April 2001 when the South East Busway was extended from Woolloongabba to Eight Mile Plains.

It is served by 15 routes operated by Brisbane Transport, Clarks Logan City Bus Service, Mt Gravatt Bus Service and Transdev Queensland as part of the TransLink network. Services to and from the Mains Road corridor join the busway at this station.

Griffith University operates a free Inter-campus bus service connecting the busway station with its nearby Mount Gravatt and Nathan campuses.

References

External links
[ Griffith University station] TransLink

Bus stations in Brisbane
Griffith University
Transport infrastructure completed in 2001